"Why" is a song by British dancehall musician Glamma Kid. It was released on 15 November 1999 as the fourth single from his debut album, Kidology (2000). A top 10 hit, the song peaked at No. 10 on the UK Singles Chart. The song features vocals from singers Marcelle Duprey and Rita Campbell, and heavily interpolates the 1982 Carly Simon hit, "Why".

Track listing

CD maxi-single 
 "Why" (Edit) - 3:32
 "Why" (Stepchild Club Mix) - 3:10
 "Why" (10° Below Vocal Mix) - 5:11
 "Why" (Clarkey & Blakey Mix) - 4:01

12" single
A1. "Why" (Edit) - 3:32
A2. "Why" (10° Below Vocal Mix) - 5:11
B1. "Why" (Giant Steps 2-Step Mix) - 5:45
B2. "Why" (Mafia & Fluxy Hard Mix) - 3:43
B3. "Why" (Clarkey & Blakey Mix) - 4:01

References

1999 songs
1999 singles
Glamma Kid songs
Songs written by Bernard Edwards
Songs written by Nile Rodgers
Warner Music Group singles